Santa Maria Arabona is a Cistercian abbey in Abruzzo, in central Italy. It is located at Manoppello in the frazione also called Santa Maria Arabona. In Roman times the area was sacred to the goddess of fertility and virginity Bona Dea.

Architecture

The most important of the abbey buildings still extant is its church, dedicated to the Virgin Mary, whose construction began in 1208 with the transept and the apse. The edifice remained partly unfinished, due to financial and political troubles within the order.

The church is built on the Latin Cross plan, with the nave ending in an apse housing the high altar. The aisles support the ceiling. The interior is very sober, apart from the richly decorated tabernacle and Paschal candle in Gothic style. The choir contains frescoes by Antonio Martini di Atri dated 1377.

The church, which was restored in the 1950s, is surrounded by a park from which the rest of the abbey is accessed.

See also
 List of Cistercian monasteries

References

Bibliography

External links

13th-century Roman Catholic church buildings in Italy
Churches in the province of Pescara
Maria Arabona
Maria Arabona
Romanesque architecture in Abruzzo
Buildings and structures in the Province of Pescara